Tala Gouveia is a British actress, best known for playing DCI Lauren McDonald in the ITV crime drama McDonald & Dodds (2020–present).

Early life
Gouveia was born in Nottingham. The daughter of two theatre actors, Gouveia trained at the Bristol Old Vic.

Career
Her first TV job was a small role in EastEnders from 2011 to 2013 as Nurse Green.

In March 2020 Gouveia played DCI McDonald in the Bath-set ITV police drama McDonald & Dodds opposite Jason Watkins and an array of guest stars including Rob Brydon, Patsy Kensit, Martin Kemp and Robert Lindsay. She has also appeared as Gemma Murphy in the ITV1 drama Cold Feet, the CBeebies' children's series Go Jetters, and the BBC1 2018 Christmas show Click & Collect. Gouveia also has credits for the 2019 film Before We Grow Old and has provided the regular voice of Cleo Farr in the animated series Scream Street alongside the likes of Jim Howick, Tyger Drew-Honey, Debra Stephenson, and John Thomson.

References

External links
 

Living people
1984 births
21st-century English actresses
Actors from Nottingham
Black British actresses
English television actresses